Evandro Elmer de Carvalho Brandão (born 7 May 1991) is an Angolan professional footballer who plays for Portuguese club Alverca as a striker.

Club career

England
Brandão was born in Luanda, Angola, but spent the first years of his life in Portugal before moving to England at the age of 9. He began his football career at Blackburn Rovers, before joining Walsall in 2003.

After three years with Walsall, Brandão signed for Manchester United on 21 October 2006, after impressing assistant manager Carlos Queiroz while on trial with United at the 2006 Under-17 Nike Cup. He had to wait five months to make his debut for the under-18s, but played in four of their last five games as the side finished fourth in the 2006–07 Premier Academy League, before being offered a trainee contract in July 2007.

The following season, Brandão scored four goals in 18 appearances for the under-18 team, adding four in 15 appearances the year after. He also made his debut for the reserves in 2008–09, coming on as a 69th-minute substitute for Magnus Wolff Eikrem in a Manchester Senior Cup game away to Bury. However, he was unable to make any more of an impression at the club, and was released on the expiry of his contract in June 2009.

Portugal
Brandão signed with Braga in the summer of 2009 but, just five months later, the deal was usurped by Benfica, who signed him on a two-and-a-half-year contract.

After spending a year in the Benfica academy, he went out on loan twice in 2010–11, first to Fátima (Segunda Liga) and then to Gondomar (third division), for whom he netted ten goals in 12 games.

Hungary
After failing to break into the Benfica first team, Brandão moved to Hungarian club Videoton in July 2011, coached by his former Portugal under-16 manager Paulo Sousa. He scored his first and only Nemzeti Bajnokság I goal for the side on 20 August, contributing to a 4–1 home win against Pécs.

Later years
In the summer of 2012, Brandão signed with Olhanense in the Portuguese top flight, on loan. He scored his first goal in the competition on 15 December to help to a 2–2 home draw with Gil Vicente, as his team went on to finish as the first above the relegation zone.

Subsequently, Brandão represented in quick succession Tondela, Libolo, Kabuscorp – both from the Angolan Girabola– and Benfica e Castelo Branco, for a total of only eight goals. On 12 July 2016, he agreed to a deal at Fafe from the Portuguese second tier.

Brandão scored his first hat-trick at the professional level on 15 January 2017, in a 4–1 victory over Braga B at the Parque Municipal dos Desportos de Fafe. In June, following relegation, he signed for Leixões also of the second division.

On 10 September 2019, Brandão joined Israeli Liga Leumit club Maccabi Petah Tikva. He returned to Portugal and its division two in the 2021 January transfer window, on a one-and-a-half-year contract at Vilafranquense.

International career
At youth level, Brandão earned 24 caps for Portugal. He switched allegiance to Angola as a senior, making his debut on 13 August 2014 by playing the last four minutes of a 0–0 friendly draw against Angola.

International goals
 (Angola score listed first, score column indicates score after each Brandão goal)

Honours
Videoton
Ligakupa: 2011–12
Szuperkupa: 2011

Libolo
Girabola: 2014, 2015

Maccabi Petah Tikva
Liga Leumit: 2019–20

References

External links

Videoton official profile 

1991 births
Living people
Portuguese sportspeople of Angolan descent
Footballers from Luanda
Portuguese footballers
Angolan footballers
Association football forwards
Blackburn Rovers F.C. players
Walsall F.C. players
Manchester United F.C. players
Primeira Liga players
Liga Portugal 2 players
Segunda Divisão players
S.L. Benfica footballers
C.D. Fátima players
Gondomar S.C. players
S.C. Olhanense players
C.D. Tondela players
Sport Benfica e Castelo Branco players
AD Fafe players
Leixões S.C. players
U.D. Vilafranquense players
F.C. Alverca players
Nemzeti Bajnokság I players
Fehérvár FC players
Girabola players
C.R.D. Libolo players
Kabuscorp S.C.P. players
Liga Leumit players
Maccabi Petah Tikva F.C. players
Portugal youth international footballers
Angola international footballers
2019 Africa Cup of Nations players
Portuguese expatriate footballers
Angolan expatriate footballers
Expatriate footballers in England
Expatriate footballers in Hungary
Expatriate footballers in Israel
Portuguese expatriate sportspeople in England
Portuguese expatriate sportspeople in Hungary
Portuguese expatriate sportspeople in Israel
Angolan expatriate sportspeople in England
Angolan expatriate sportspeople in Hungary